Beauty4 was a Taiwanese girl group made up of singers Anji Clubb, Belinda Cheng, Ayesha Adamo, and Djavan Lin. The group was known for their sexy style and energetic, self-confident attitude, and was often compared to the UK's Spice Girls in the media.

The Group's History

Beauty4 was created by Corbett Wall. On November 22, 2000, Beauty4 released their self-titled debut album on EMI Records Taiwan, their first single, “Ai Ai Ai” (Love Love Love), already having received attention as the closing song of the popular evening soap Ling-Lan. The song was so popular, in fact, that it soon bumped a song by the more well-known Wang Fei out of the opening position for the show.

During promotion of their album, Beauty4 performed before tens of thousands, sharing the stage with many recognized artists, including their "brother" group B.A.D. (also on EMI), May Day, Karen Mok, and one of their favorite Mandarin bands, Sticky Rice. They even performed a concert with the Canadian band The Moffatts, whose popular song "Bang Bang Boom" was re-made by Beauty4 in Mandarin. Beauty4's songs made the Top 20 video countdowns on Channel V and MTV in Taiwan. Their album was also released in mainland China, although two of their songs, "Gay Guy", penned by Cheng in a combination of English, Mandarin, and Taiwanese and lamented how all the cute boys she meets turn out to be gay, and "San Gu Liu Pau," were banned.

The group was also booked for many endorsements and commercials, including full commercial and print campaigns for the Jian Fu San amusement park and Bao Dao Mei Mei watch company. Cheng also became known for her acting skills, playing the role of mean girl Bai-He in the international Chinese hit and evening soap Meteor Garden.  Ayesha, Anji and Djavan also appeared on the show in cameo roles as girlfriends of the show's stars. Anji later appeared in the role of Maria on Yamada Tarō Monogatari, another Chinese soap.

Beauty4 ultimately split due to differences with their management and difficulties being accepted as a foreign-looking group on Asian soil. Although Anji Clubb was a red-haired Caucasian American, and Ayesha Adamo an American exchange student with blonde and pink hair, the rest of the group (and thus half of it) was, in fact, of Taiwanese ethnicity, yet this did not seem to be enough for Beauty4 to truly fit in with the Taiwanese popular culture of the time. It seemed not to matter that the group's language skills were strong enough to be able to take over the hosting duties on the morning talk radio show on Taipei's Power 98.9 for an entire week, or that their involvement in Taiwanese culture was enough to be able to participate in its variety shows and Chinese New Year events (they even gave a concert to the Republic of China Army on the island of Kinmen for example). At one of their New Year's Eve performances, Anji Clubb, moved to tears at the sight of fans singing along with all the words to "Ai Ai Ai", expressed the feelings of the group by saying, "I've lived in Taiwan for so many years, all along living with Taiwanese people. I consider this place my home.  I hope that everyone won't keep thinking of Beauty4 as foreigners; we'd like everyone to think of us as a part of what Taiwan is."

Members before and after Beauty4

Anji Clubb came to Taiwan as a nine-year-old and spent several years of elementary school in the Taiwanese school system, making her Mandarin completely fluent. After the breakup of Beauty4, Clubb returned to the US, having spent half of her life overseas, and recently graduated from Georgetown University, though she also took time to study in Beijing.  She is currently the China Programs Associate at Campaign for Tobacco Free Kids, a non-profit organization with programs in the U.S. and abroad.

Belinda Cheng, the jet-haired Chinese-American, was the first to audition for the group's management company.  She auditioned in California, where she was born and raised. Belinda Cheng returned to Los Angeles after the group's breakup and graduated from UCLA. She is now working at Disney Interactive Studios and working towards an MBA at UCLA.

The blonde and pink-haired Ayesha Adamo was a Columbia University student spending the summer in Taiwan studying Chinese when she auditioned and found her way into the group. Although she had only studied Chinese at college for one year, she was able to keep up with the challenges of singing and interviewing in Mandarin. Adamo released a mix album that was a double CD box set as a DJ on Hinote Records in Taiwan.  She graduated with a degree in music from Barnard College, and completed the two-year acting program at William Esper Studios.  She performed at Radio City Music Hall in New York with Mandarin pop star Qsi Qsin for a New Year's Concert in 2006. She is currently acting, deejaying, and recording new music.

Finally, the curly-haired, oft-mistaken-for-African-American Djavan Lin was born and raised in Taiwan, and is of Taiwanese aboriginal origin. Djavan Lin has continued her singing career, and performed on CTV Network's popular singing competition. She is currently singing and performing in Macau.

References

See also

 Mando-pop
 Taiwanese pop

Taiwanese girl groups
Musical quartets